Kaarina may refer to:

 Kaarina, a small town and municipality of Finland
 Kaarina (name), a Finnish female given name
 2257 Kaarina, a main-belt asteroid